The seventh season of Stargate SG-1, an American-Canadian television series, began airing on June 13, 2003 on Sci Fi. The seventh season concluded after 22 episodes on  March 9, 2004 on British Sky One, which overtook the Sci-Fi Channel in mid-season. The series was developed by Brad Wright and Jonathan Glassner. Season seven regular cast members include Richard Dean Anderson, Amanda Tapping, Christopher Judge, Don S. Davis, and Michael Shanks.

Production
With "Fallen", Michael Shanks (Dr. Daniel Jackson) rejoins the cast, and Corin Nemec (Jonas Quinn) gets billed as a "Guest Star" (besides "Fallen"/"Homecoming", he would have his only other guest appearance later in "Fallout"). George Touliatos previously played Pyrus, Shyla's father, in "Need." The scenes with the Goa'uld motherships flying in hyperspace are actually stock footage from the Season 2 episode "The Serpent's Lair." Director Martin Wood has a cameo in "Fallen" as the man in the elevator with Jonas at the beginning of the episode. Peter DeLuise, who directed "Fragile Balance", provided the voice of Loki in the same episode. Christopher Heyerdahl, who played Pallan in "Revisions", would later play the recurring characters of Halling and the Wraith 'Todd' on Stargate Atlantis. Peter LaCroix previously played the Ashrak in "In the Line of Duty".

Kavan Smith, who appeared in "Enemy Mine" as Major Lorne would later reprise this role as a recurring character in Stargate Atlantis. In "Space Race", Alex Zahara takes on the role of Warrick, who was played by Dion Johnstone in "Forsaken". This marks Zahara's sixth different character that he has played on Stargate, usually under make-up. It's also the second week in a row that someone else has taken over a role originally played by Dion Johnstone. G. Patrick Currie, who plays Eamon in this episode, took over Johnstone's role as Chaka in the previous weeks. Patrick Currie (Eamon) previously played Fifth in season six's "Unnatural Selection". The weapon Carter uses in "Avenger 2.0" (referred to as the Carter Special) was created as the show could not use P90s as the Iraq War made getting hold of the cartridges difficult.

"Chimera" was alternatively entitled Black Widow Carter. In the episode, Carter mentions how all of her boyfriends in the past are dead, which is accurate. David DeLuise appeared as the fourth DeLuise on Stargate – Dom, Michael, and Peter have all appeared in the past. At one point, Carter hums the Stargate SG-1 theme tune in the elevator in the episode, breaking the Fourth wall. Amanda Tapping actually wanted to hum the MacGyver theme but couldn't remember the melody. Carter also says that Colorado Springs has no zoo, when it in fact does, the Cheyenne Mountain Zoo. Producer Joseph Mallozzi said that this was supposed to be a subtle hint that Carter spends too much time at work to notice what her city has to offer. At the beginning of the episode, there is a shot of what should be the University of Chicago, in fact the shot is of the University of Chicago Lab School, a lower school affiliate. "Heroes, Part 2" was the 150th episode of Stargate SG-1 to be aired. Adam Baldwin, who plays Colonel Dave Dixon, commander of SG-13, in this episode, is well known among sci-fi fans for playing Jayne Cobb in the cult hit Firefly and its big-screen adaptation Serenity and also Marcus Hamilton in Angel. Mitchell Kosterman previously played a different character, Special Agent James Hamner, in "Seth". "Heroes" also marks the first appearance of Agent Richard Woolsey (Robert Picardo) on the series. Picardo is most well known for playing the holographic Doctor on Star Trek: Voyager. Another veteran of Star Trek, Jolene Blalock—who played T'Pol from Star Trek: Enterprise—appears in "Birthright".

"Resurrection" is the first SG-1 episode directed by Amanda Tapping. It is also the only SG-1 episode to have both been written by an actor on the show (Michael Shanks) and to be directed by one as well. The White House interior set in "Inauguration" and "Lost City" is the same one used in X-Men 2. Along with "Disclosure", "Inauguration" is one of only two episodes where none of the regular characters except General Hammond are featured. This is the only season of Stargate SG-1 to air on the Sci-Fi Channel to feature the original Showtime cast.

Release
For the episode "Lifeboat", Michael Shanks won a Leo Award in the category "Dramatic Series: Best Lead Performance – Male", and Teryl Rothery was nominated for a Leo Award in the category "Dramatic Series: Best Supporting Performance – Female". "Enemy Mine" won a Leo Award in the category "Dramatic Series: Best Make-Up". For the episode "Grace", Amanda Tapping won a Leo Award in the category "Dramatic Series: Best Lead Performance – Female". "Heroes" was nominated for a Hugo Award in the category Best Dramatic Presentation – Short Form. For "Heroes, Part 2", Andy Mikita was nominated for a Leo Award in the category "Dramatic Series: Best Direction", and Don S. Davis was nominated for a Leo Award in the category "Dramatic Series: Best Supporting Performance – Male". "Lost City, Part 2" was nominated for an Emmy Award in the category Outstanding Special Visual Effects for a Series and for a Gemini Award in the category Best Visual Effects.

Cultural references
In "Avenger 2.0", Dr. Felger (Patrick McKenna), who first appeared in Season 6's "The Other Guys", prominently packs a roll of duct tape during his preparations for going offworld. This is a reference to The Red Green Show, which featured Patrick McKenna in a regular role.

Main cast

 Richard Dean Anderson as Colonel Jack O'Neill
 Amanda Tapping as Major Samantha Carter
 Christopher Judge as Teal'c
 Don S. Davis as Major General George Hammond
 Michael Shanks as Dr. Daniel Jackson

Episodes

Episodes in bold are continuous episodes, where the story spans over 2 or more episodes.

References

External links

 Season 7 on GateWorld
 Season 7 on IMDb
 Season 7 on TV.com
 

 07
2003 American television seasons
2004 American television seasons
SG-1 07
2003 Canadian television seasons
2004 Canadian television seasons